A charge artist (or charge scenic artist and also head scenic artist) leads and oversees the painting of stage, film or television scenery. In the United States such individuals are typically members of the United Scenic Artists union.

The charge artist's responsibilities include methods of reproduction of color, texture, preparation and aging of all surfaces. 

The charge artist interprets the scenic designer's technical drawings and paint elevations, and with a crew of journeymen scenic artists, brings them to life on the actual scenery. 

The charge artist is also responsible for the budgeting of the finished sets along with the production designer and the art director.

Scenic artists
 Sabrina Jones
 Yuri Makoveychuk
 Roman Turovsky
 Michael Zansky
 D. Dominick Lombardi

References 

Scenic design
Theatrical occupations
Filmmaking